The Raven Rock Historic District is a historic district located along Daniel Bray Highway (NJ 29) and Quarry Road in the hamlet of Raven Rock in Delaware Township, Hunterdon County, New Jersey. The district was added to the National Register of Historic Places on November 10, 2015 for its significance in community development and architecture.

Gallery of contributing properties

References

External links
 

Delaware Township, Hunterdon County, New Jersey
National Register of Historic Places in Hunterdon County, New Jersey
Historic districts on the National Register of Historic Places in New Jersey
New Jersey Register of Historic Places